Kannan Thamarakkulam
is an Indian film director who works in Malayalam films. His first direction venture was Thinkal Muthal Velli Vare (2015). His second release was Jayaram's big budget film Aadupuliyattam in 2016.

Personal life
Thamarakkulam married Vishnu Prabha in a small ceremony at Chettikulangara in December 2020.

Filmography

Television

References

External links
 

Malayalam film directors
Film directors from Kerala
Living people
Tamil-language film directors
1979 births
Artists from Alappuzha
21st-century Indian film directors